The Essential Electric Light Orchestra is a single CD, US-only compilation album by the Electric Light Orchestra (ELO), released in 2003. It is part of Sony Music's The Essential series.

On 2 September 2008 an eco-friendly repackage of this album called Playlist: The Very Best of Electric Light Orchestra was released and included a multimedia section on the CD with photos, credits and two new wallpapers.

A third re-release in 2011 expanded the original album to include a second disc and also rearranged the entire track order. This is the third ELO compilation that presents a chronological run-through of ELO's singles/songs, it was preceded by US compilations Olé ELO in 1976 and Strange Magic: The Best of Electric Light Orchestra in 1995. The original artwork has been slightly altered as well to differentiate from the single CD release.

Track listing
All tracks are written by Jeff Lynne, with the exception of Roll Over Beethoven by Chuck Berry

Original Edition

2011 Edition

Charts

Certifications

References

Albums produced by Jeff Lynne
Electric Light Orchestra compilation albums
2003 greatest hits albums
Epic Records compilation albums
Legacy Recordings compilation albums
Sony Records compilation albums